The Tikitere Graben is a intra-rift graben in the North Island of New Zealand that contains the Ohau Channel which drains Lake Rotorua into Lake Rotoiti but with a minimal drop.

Geography
The Ohau Channel ultimately allows both lakes to drain into the Kaituna River through drainage that is also associated with the graben. The Tikitere Graben also is associated with the geothermal tourist attraction of Hell's Gate and the western aspects of Lake Rotoiti.

Geology
The tectonically subsiding Tikitere Graben at 2mm/year  has destroyed the Rotorua Caldera rim at this point so providing the natural outlet for Lake Rotorua. The graben is an intra-rift graben in the Taupo Rift and is delimited by two unnamed active faults in the current active NZ fault database (#3590 and #2210). Drainage of this initial lake is not known but could have been through the Tikitere Graben always or perhaps initially through the Hemo Gap to the south of the present town of Rotorua. Whatever at some stage drainage of Rotorua Lake through the Tikitere Graben became established but prior to the Rotoiti eruption in the Ōkataina Volcanic Centre of 47,400 years ago drainage may not have been through what seems to be a very young Kaituna River gorge. By about 9500 years ago dome building activity in the eastern Haroharo portions of the Ōkataina Volcanic Centre had raised Lake Rotoiti to a maximum elevation of  so it started flowing down the Kaituna River and in due course further graben sinking resulted in both lakes having a near common outlet level of today's .

References

Landforms of the Bay of Plenty Region
Taupō Volcanic Zone
Rotorua
Rotorua Volcanic Centre
Rivers of the Bay of Plenty Region